The Constitution and External Affairs Directorates are a group of directorates of the Scottish Government, responsible for co-ordinating policy in Scotland relating to constitutional matters, elections and freedom of information, as well as managing Scottish Cabinet businesses and the legislative programme for Government.

Composition

Cabinet Secretaries and Ministers

Management

 Ken Thomson, Director-General Constitution and External Affairs

References

Directorates of the Scottish Government